Assassination Brigade is a novel of the long-running Nick Carter-Killmaster series.

Publishing history
The book was first published in 1973

Plot summary
Carter must battle sleeper agent assassins to recover a stolen Chinese nuclear missile and stop a mad scientist from taking over the world.

Main characters
Nick Carter, agent N-3, AXE
Hawk, Carter’s boss, head of AXE
Maria, Helga and Elsa von Adler, identical blonde triplets
Dr Felix von Adler, former Nazi mind control expert
Z1, AXE agent
Dr Tom Christopher, AXE medical expert
Dummlier, AXE agent France station
Chiclet, AXE Station chief, Monaco
Marcel Clement, AXE field agent, Nice
Bonaparte, (code name) AXE agent, Paris
Hans Verblen, AXE agent, Bern
Dr Bosch, Swiss spa owner
Suzanne Henley, spa worker

1973 American novels
Nick Carter-Killmaster novels